Bogert House is located in Demarest, Bergen County, New Jersey, United States. The house was built in 1740 and was added to the National Register of Historic Places on January 9, 1983.

See also
 National Register of Historic Places listings in Bergen County, New Jersey
 John Jacob Bogert House

References

Demarest, New Jersey
Houses on the National Register of Historic Places in New Jersey
Houses completed in 1740
Houses in Bergen County, New Jersey
National Register of Historic Places in Bergen County, New Jersey
New Jersey Register of Historic Places
1740 establishments in New Jersey